Amasa Mason Lyman (March 30, 1813 – February 4, 1877) was an early leader in the Latter Day Saint movement and was an apostle. He was also a counselor in the First Presidency to Joseph Smith.

Early life and conversion
Lyman was born in Lyman, New Hampshire, the third son of Roswell Lyman and Martha Mason. In the spring of 1832, Lyman met two traveling Latter Day Saint missionaries, Orson Pratt and Lyman E. Johnson. Lyman was baptized a member of the Church of Christ on April 27, 1832, by Johnson. On April 28, Lyman was confirmed by Pratt.

After becoming a Latter Day Saint, Lyman traveled 370 miles to Palmyra, New York, where he hoped to meet Joseph Smith and Martin Harris. (Smith and Harris had lived in the Palmyra area when they published the Book of Mormon and organized the church in 1830). When Lyman arrived in Palmyra, he discovered that Smith and Harris had moved to Ohio the previous year, and that Smith was currently visiting Missouri.

Determined to join the Latter Day Saints in Ohio, Lyman found temporary employment on the farm of Thomas Lackey, who had bought Harris's farm. (Harris had sold it to raise money for the publication of the Book of Mormon). After working for two weeks, Lyman earned enough money to take a ship from Buffalo, New York, to Cleveland, Ohio. From Cleveland, Lyman walked the 45 miles to Hiram, where he was told Smith and his family were living. When Lyman met John Johnson, the owner of the house where Smith was living, he discovered that Johnson was the father of the missionary who had baptized him just weeks before. Johnson invited Lyman to live at his house and work on his farm. Lyman did so from June 5 until August 1832. Lyman met Smith on July 1 when Smith returned to Hiram from Missouri.

Missionary service and church leadership
In August 1832, Smith told Lyman that "the Lord requires your labors in the vineyard". Lyman agreed to serve a mission for the church. On August 23, Lyman was ordained an elder by Smith and Frederick G. Williams. The following day, he departed with Zerubbabel Snow as a missionary. Lyman served with Snow and William F. Cahoon in the eastern United States, preaching as far east as Cabell County, Virginia, in present-day West Virginia. On December 11, 1833, Lyman was ordained a high priest by Lyman E. Johnson and Orson Pratt, the same elders who had taught and baptized him in 1832.

Lyman returned to church headquarters in Kirtland, Ohio, in May 1835. At a conference of the church in June, Lyman was called by Smith to be a member of the newly organized First Quorum of the Seventy. In 1836, Lyman received the "Kirtland endowment" in the Kirtland Temple.

Marriage and family
In 1835, Lyman married Louisa Maria Tanner in Kirtland. They had eight children.

In April 1844, Smith taught Lyman the principle of plural marriage. "As he warmly grasped my hand for the last time," Lyman later recalled, "[Smith said] brother Amasa, go and practice on the principles I have taught you, and God bless you." Soon Lyman married his first and second plural wives, Diontha Walker and Caroline Partridge.

In 1846, Lyman married four additional wives: Eliza Maria Partridge (one of numerous widows of Smith and the 25-year-old sister of Lyman's wife Caroline), Paulina Eliza Phelps, Priscilla Turley, and Cornelia Leavitt. In 1851, Lyman married his eighth and final wife, Lydia Partridge, a sister of his wives Caroline and Eliza.

Additional missions
Lyman served several missions for the church, preaching in Vermont, New Hampshire, New York, Wisconsin, Illinois, and Tennessee. In 1838, Lyman followed Smith to Far West, Missouri, where Smith relocated the headquarters of the church. Lyman participated in the Battle of Crooked River, a skirmish between Latter Day Saints and a Missouri militia unit from Ray County, which occurred on October 25, 1838.

In 1839, Lyman traveled with the Latter Day Saints to their new headquarters in Nauvoo, Illinois. In 1841, Lyman was appointed regent of the newly organized University of Nauvoo. On August 20, 1842, Smith called Lyman to serve as an apostle of the church. Lyman filled a vacancy in the Quorum of the Twelve created by the excommunication of Orson Pratt. Five months later, on January 20, 1843, Pratt was rebaptized and restored to his former position in the Quorum of the Twelve. As the most junior and "thirteenth" apostle, Lyman was excluded from the Quorum.

On February 4, 1843, Smith called Lyman to serve as an additional counselor in the First Presidency. Due to the turbulence of the years 1843 and 1844 for the Latter Day Saints, especially after Smith's death, Lyman was never sustained at a conference of the church to this position.

Follower of Brigham Young
In July 1844 while traveling, Lyman learned that Smith and his brother Hyrum had been killed by a mob at Carthage, Illinois. He returned to Nauvoo. When apostles Brigham Young, Heber C. Kimball, Wilford Woodruff, Pratt, and Lyman Wight arrived in Nauvoo on August 6, Lyman sided with the group of Latter Day Saints who supported the leadership of Young and the Quorum of the Twelve Apostles, as opposed to that of Sidney Rigdon, Smith's First Counselor in the First Presidency.

Young restored Lyman as a member of the Quorum of the Twelve Apostles on August 12, 1844. In 1847, Lyman and his seven wives and children traveled with the Mormon pioneers who followed Young to the Salt Lake Valley in present-day Utah.

Young chose Lyman and Charles C. Rich to lead an expedition to establish a Mormon foothold in the San Bernardino Valley in southern California, a long-held ambition for Young. In March 1851, 437 Latter-day Saints under the leadership of Lyman and Rich left Great Salt Lake City. After traversing the Cajon Pass, the group purchased Rancho San Bernardino from the Lugo family, and built Fort San Bernardino. The fort quickly grew into a burgeoning settlement, reaching a population of 3,000 in 1856 and spurring the creation of a new county (split off from Los Angeles County in 1853) and the incorporation of a new municipality (in 1854). Lyman served as the first mayor of San Bernardino.

Charges of heresy and excommunication
In 1860, Young appointed three of the twelve apostles—Lyman, Charles C. Rich, and George Q. Cannon—to the presidency of the church's European Mission. On March 16, 1862, Lyman preached a sermon in Dundee, Scotland, which all but denied the reality of and the necessity for the atonement of Jesus Christ, which is a central tenet of the LDS Church. His speech appeared to have been overlooked for years, but on January 21, 1867, Lyman was brought before his fellow quorum members to answer for his heretical words. Lyman confessed his error and apologized to the quorum. He wrote a letter of apology to the general membership of the church, which was published in the Deseret News.

However, months later, Lyman began publicly preaching the substance of his 1862 Dundee speech. As a result of his failure to live up to his confession and apology, the church stripped Lyman of the apostleship on May 6, 1867.

Following his removal, Lyman obeyed the counsel of the quorum members, even though he felt the advice was unappealing, and nineteen months later he was regularly attending Church services.  However, in 1869, while not admitting any conversations to the Church of Zion, known as the Godbeites, Lyman began a relationship with William S. Godbe, and began traveling to Salt Lake City to meet with Godbe and his associates.  Lyman associated constantly, preached, and even openly participated with the Godbeites.  Lyman's renewed activism spread through Salt Lake City, and rumors began to be circulated that Lyman would even become president of the Church of Zion.

On May 10, 1870, three representatives from the Salt Lake Stake high council, where Lyman was residing, came to investigate his  activism and the rumors.  Following the meeting the three took their findings to the high council, and the council excommunicated Lyman on May 12, 1870.

Death
Lyman died at Fillmore, Utah Territory on February 4, 1877. He and seven of his eight wives were the parents of 38 children. On January 12, 1909, by direction of church president Joseph F. Smith, Lyman was posthumously reinstated as a church member and an apostle, persuaded by assertions of mental illness.

Notable descendants and relatives
 Sons Francis M. Lyman and Platte D. Lyman both served as president of the European Mission of the LDS Church.
 Francis M. Lyman and his grandson Richard R. Lyman, became apostles in the LDS Church. Francis became the President of the Quorum of the Twelve Apostles.
 Great-great-grandson James E. Faust served as an apostle for 29 years and as second counselor in the First Presidency of the church (1995–2007).
Lyman Hall, a member of the Lyman family, was a signer of the Declaration of Independence.
Alexander Joseph Lyman notable  musician of Salt Lake City

Chart: Lyman's 8 Wives and 38 Children

Notes

References
 
Amasa M. Lyman, "Amasa Lyman's Story", Millennial Star, vol. 27, no. 30 (July 29, 1865), pp. 472–473; vol. 27, no. 31 (Aug. 5, 1865), pp. 487–489; vol. 27, no. 32 (Aug. 12, 1865), pp. 502–504; vol. 27, no. 33 (Aug. 19, 1865), pp. 519–521; vol. 27, no. 34 (Aug. 26, 1865), pp. 535–537; vol. 27 no. 35 (September 2, 1865), pp. 552–553.

External links
 
 
 Utah History Encyclopedia Entry
 Grampa Bill's G.A. Pages: Amasa M. Lyman
 Text of Millennial Star 1863-1865 series "Amasa Lyman's History"
 Family Search at churchofjesuschrist.org
 The Edward Partridge Family
 Autobiography of Eliza Partridge Smith Lyman
 
George S. Tanner, John Tanner and His Family, (1974).
 Lyman, Edward Leo, Amasa Mason Lyman, Mormon Apostle and Apostate: A Study in Dedication (2009). .
 Eliza Maria Partridge Lyman diary, in the L. Tom Perry Special Collections, Harold B. Lee Library, Brigham Young University

1813 births
1877 deaths
19th-century American politicians
19th-century Mormon missionaries
American Mormon missionaries in the United Kingdom
American Mormon missionaries in the United States
American general authorities (LDS Church)
Apostles (LDS Church)
Apostles of the Church of Christ (Latter Day Saints)
Converts to Mormonism
Counselors in the First Presidency (LDS Church)
Doctrine and Covenants people
Godbeites
Latter Day Saints from Illinois
Latter Day Saints from New Hampshire
Latter Day Saints from Ohio
Latter Day Saints from Utah
Mayors of San Bernardino, California
Mission presidents (LDS Church)
Mormon missionaries in Europe
People excommunicated by the Church of Jesus Christ of Latter-day Saints
People from Grafton County, New Hampshire
Religious leaders from New Hampshire